Charles Dwight "Red" Adams (October 7, 1921 – January 18, 2017) was an American professional baseball pitcher, scout and pitching coach. The native of Parlier, California, pitched only briefly in Major League Baseball, but had a lengthy career as a scout and coach for the Los Angeles Dodgers.

Adams won 193 games in the minor leagues from 1939 to 1942 and in 1944–58, including a 21-victory season for the 1945 Los Angeles Angels of the Pacific Coast League. All of his appearances came in relief. His one decision came on Memorial Day, when he allowed a game-winning home run to Ray Mueller of the Cincinnati Reds, which capped a six-run, ninth-inning rally and enabled Cincinnati to defeat Chicago, 7–6, at Wrigley Field, in the second game of the holiday doubleheader. Adams allowed 11 earned runs, 18 hits and seven bases on balls in 12 total innings pitched during his MLB career, with eight strikeouts.

After his playing career, he was a scout for the Dodgers from 1959 to 1968. He then worked as the Dodgers' MLB pitching coach from 1969 to 1980, serving on three National League pennant-winning teams (1974; 1977–78) under managers Walter Alston and Tommy Lasorda, and helping develop many of the Dodgers' pitchers. Said 324-game-winning pitcher Don Sutton upon his induction into the Baseball Hall of Fame in July 1998: "No person ever meant more to my career than Red Adams. Without him, I would not be standing in Cooperstown today." Tommy John, 288-game winner, also had praise for Adams. "When I joined the [Dodgers in 1972], I was still convinced that I had only a mediocre fastball and that I was going to have to depend chiefly on my breaking pitches to win ball games. But Red disagreed with me, emphatically," John said. Adams encouraged him to rely more on the fastball, which though slower than most pitchers' fastballs, had a lot of movement.

In 1979, Adams was inducted into the Fresno County Athletic Hall of Fame. He died on January 18, 2017, at the age of 95.

References

External links

Baseball Almanac statistics
Dodgers coaching list
Venezuelan Professional Baseball League statistics

   

1921 births
2017 deaths
Baseball players from California
Bisbee Bees players
Chicago Cubs players
Los Angeles Angels (minor league) players
Los Angeles Dodgers coaches
Los Angeles Dodgers scouts
Major League Baseball pitchers
Major League Baseball pitching coaches
Miami Marlins (IL) players
Minor league baseball managers
Patriotas de Venezuela players
People from Parlier, California
Portland Beavers players
Sacramento Solons players
San Diego Padres (minor league) players
Sportspeople from Fresno County, California
Tulsa Oilers (baseball) players
Vancouver Capilanos players